Armadale railway station served the town of Armadale, West Lothian, Scotland from 1862 to 1956 on the Bathgate and Coatbridge Railway.

History 
The station opened on 11 August 1862 by the Monkland Railways. To the south was the goods yard and to the southwest was the signal box, which opened in 1904 when the line was doubled, as well as two more platforms being added and the station being enlarged. A siding to the south served Cappers Pit. The station closed on 9 January 1956, the signal box closing in the same year.
A new station at Armadale was opened on a different site on 4 March 2011.

References

External links 

Disused railway stations in West Lothian
Railway stations in Great Britain opened in 1862
Railway stations in Great Britain closed in 1956
1862 establishments in Scotland
1956 disestablishments in Scotland
Former North British Railway stations